Sebastian Kräuter (December 22, 1922, in Nițchidorf, Banat – January 29, 2008, in Timișoara) was the Roman Catholic bishop of the Timișoara diocese in Romania between 1990 and 1999.

Biography
Sebastian Kräuter was the son of businessman Balthasar Kräuter and his wife Katharina. His brother, Dr. theol. Franz Kräuter, was for many years the archivist of the diocese Timișoara. His father's ancestors came from the Palatine Hauenstein and migrated in the 18th century to Banat.

Sebastian Kräuter attended elementary school in Nitzkydorf. He studied philosophy and theology at the seminary in Timișoara. He was ordained priest on 2 June 1946 at the Temeswarer Dom by bishop Augustin Pacha. Between 1946 and 1964 he was a curate at the parish Faire, and in 1983 became the pastor of the community.

Kräuter was ordained bishop of the Diocese of Timișoara on 28 April 1990. He was co-editor and author of the foreword of the 1995 biography of his predecessor, Augustin Pacha "Erinnerungen an Bischof Pacha: Ein Stück Banater Heimatgeschichte". Kräuter stepped down in 1999 in favor of Martin Roos.

Kräuter died on January 29, 2008, and was buried on February 1, 2008, in the crypt of the Timișoara Roman Catholic cathedral.

References

External links

1922 births
2008 deaths
Romanian people of German descent
Roman Catholic bishops of Timișoara
20th-century Roman Catholic bishops in Romania